Fredrik Palm  (born 19 December 1974) is a Swedish Olympic windsurfer. He finished 19th in the Mistral event at the 1996 Summer Olympics and 23rd in the Mistral event at the 2000 Summer Olympics.

References

External links
 
 
 

1974 births
Living people
Swedish windsurfers
Swedish male sailors (sport)
Jollekappseglarna Västerås sailors
Olympic sailors of Sweden
Sailors at the 1996 Summer Olympics – Mistral One Design
Sailors at the 2000 Summer Olympics – Mistral One Design